Flussio is a comune (municipality) in the Province of Oristano in the Italian region Sardinia, located about  northwest of Cagliari and about  north of Oristano.

Flussio borders the following municipalities: Magomadas, Modolo, Sagama, Scano di Montiferro, Sennariolo, Suni, Tinnura, Tresnuraghes.

Demographic evolution

References

External links

 www.comune.flussio.nu.it/

Cities and towns in Sardinia